Mason Schreck (born November 4, 1993) is an American football tight end for the Houston Texans of the National Football League (NFL). He played college football at Buffalo.

Amateur career 
Schreck attended Medina High School in Medina, Ohio where he played both basketball and football. Schreck played primarily as a quarterback at Medina and threw for 667 yards and eight touchdowns as a junior. He was recruited by college football programs including Ohio State, Iowa, South Florida, Cincinnati, North Carolina State, Northwestern and Bowling Green but ultimately only received offers from Toledo and Buffalo.

In 2012 Schreck signed a letter of intent to play at Buffalo where Jeff Quinn recruited him to play tight end. After redshirting as a freshman at the University at Buffalo in 2012, Schreck caught a total of six touchdown passes from Joe Licata and Tyree Jackson between 2013 and 2016. As a redshirt senior in 2016, he set a school record for a tight end with 651 receiving yards and was named to the All-Mid-American Conference Second-team.

Professional career

Cincinnati Bengals
Schreck was drafted in the seventh round (251st overall) by the Cincinnati Bengals in the 2017 NFL Draft and was signed to a four-year, $2.46 million contract. He was placed on injured reserve on September 2, 2017.

Schreck played in six games in 2018 before being placed on injured reserve on October 23, 2018 with a knee injury.

Schreck was waived during final roster cuts on August 31, 2019 and was signed to the practice squad the next day. He was promoted to the active roster on November 30, 2019. He appeared in two games in the 2019 season; he was on the field for 22 snaps against the New York Jets on December 1 and one snap against the New England Patriots two weeks later.

On September 5, 2020, Schreck was waived by the Bengals. He was signed to the practice squad the following day. He was promoted to the active roster on September 18. Schreck was targeted with a pass for the first time in his pro career in the thirteenth week of the 2020 season; he dropped the ball on a two-yard pass from Brandon Allen. Two weeks later, Schreck recorded the first tackle of his NFL career when he brought down Pittsburgh Steelers punt returner Ray-Ray McCloud after a return of only eight yards.

On August 31, 2021, Schreck was waived by the Bengals and re-signed to the practice squad the next day.

Houston Texans
On June 11, 2022, Schreck signed with the Houston Texans. He was released on August 30, 2022 and signed to the practice squad the next day. Schreck made his Texans debut in the fourth week of the season at NRG Stadium and, in his sixth professional season, caught the first pass of his career on a short throw from Davis Mills; he was tackled by Derwin James before being able to gain any ground. The following week, he was an offensive starter for just the second time in his career and was on the field for a career high 24 offensive plays. He also tallied the first receiving yards of his career, picking up six yards on a pass from Mills before being brought down by Foyesade Oluokun of the Jacksonville Jaguars. The Texans returned him to their practice squad the following day. He signed a reserve/future contract on January 10, 2023.

References

External links
 Buffalo Bulls bio
 

1993 births
Living people
People from Medina, Ohio
Players of American football from Ohio
Sportspeople from Greater Cleveland
American football tight ends
Buffalo Bulls football players
Cincinnati Bengals players
Houston Texans players